Marc Roguet (born 29 March 1933) is an equestrian from France and Olympic champion. He won a gold medal in show jumping with the French team at the 1976 Summer Olympics in Montreal.

References

1933 births
Living people
French male equestrians
Olympic equestrians of France
Olympic gold medalists for France
Equestrians at the 1976 Summer Olympics
Olympic medalists in equestrian
Medalists at the 1976 Summer Olympics